The 1977 Cincinnati Bearcats football team represented University of Cincinnati during 1977 NCAA Division I-A football season. The Bearcats, led by first-year head coach Ralph Staub, participated as independent and played their home games at Nippert Stadium.

Schedule

References

Cincinnati
Cincinnati Bearcats football seasons
Cincinnati Bearcats football